Ouzouer-des-Champs is a commune in the Loiret department in north-central France.

See also
Communes of the Loiret department

References

Ouzouerdeschamps